Nicola Laura Kaye (born 11 February 1980) is a New Zealand politician who served as Deputy Leader of the New Zealand National Party and Deputy Leader of the Opposition from 22 May 2020 to 14 July 2020.

Kaye served as the member of the New Zealand Parliament for the  electorate from 2008 until 2020. In January 2013, she was appointed to the Cabinet by Prime Minister John Key, giving her the portfolios of Food Safety, Civil Defence, and Youth Affairs, and Associate Minister of Education and Immigration. In September 2016 she took sick leave from the House of Representatives for breast cancer treatment and returned to Parliament in early 2017 to resume full duties.

Kaye announced on 16 July 2020 she was leaving politics at the 2020 general election.

Early life
Kaye was born in Auckland and grew up in Epsom and Kohimarama. Kaye's parents separated when she was seven years old. Her family includes a brother and sister, "two half-brothers, four half-sisters, one stepbrother and two step-parents".

She was educated at Victoria Avenue Primary School, Remuera Intermediate School, and Corran School (where she was Head Prefect), before earning a science degree in genetics from the University of Otago, where she also began her Bachelor of Laws, later completing it in Wellington.

Kaye is an accomplished competitive athlete, having been the Auckland Women's 3,000 m running champion in 1997, and has raced in numerous marathons and multi-sport events. In 2008 Kaye competed in the Coast to Coast multi-sport event. In February 2013, Kaye completed the Coast to Coast race a second time, becoming the first New Zealand Cabinet Minister to do so.

In 1997, Kaye participated in a television documentary called Fish out of Water, in which she and five other teenagers were marooned on Rakitu Island (off Great Barrier Island) and fended for themselves for eight days. The documentary footage was located in March 2014 and was published on New Zealand on Air's on-line archive NZ On Screen as part of its "before they were famous" series.

Kaye joined the National Party in 1998, becoming women's vice-chair of the southern region of the New Zealand Young Nationals. She is a former International Vice-Chairman of the International Young Democrat Union.

Kaye began working for Bill English in the office of the Leader of the Opposition in 2002 as a policy researcher. In 2003 she travelled to the United Kingdom, where she worked as a policy officer and project manager at the London boroughs of Enfield and Bromley, and then at Transport for London, where she managed a disabled people transport program, before working as an IT project manager at the Halifax Bank of Scotland.

In 2006, Kaye co-founded a website, networkme.com, and acts as Director of Communications for that company.

Member of Parliament

Kaye returned to New Zealand in late 2007 to contest the National Party candidacy for the Auckland Central electorate. Standing against three other nominees, Kaye was considered an outsider in a close selection battle against sitting list MP Jackie Blue for the nomination.

Kaye worked full-time as the National Party candidate from the time of her selection. She campaigned on improving public transport infrastructure, improving marine protection around Great Barrier Island, and taking a greater interest in small businesses in Auckland. During her campaign she knocked on 10,000 doors.

At the general election on 8 November 2008, Kaye was elected as National's MP for Auckland Central, defeating incumbent Labour MP Judith Tizard. This was greeted as one of the most significant upsets of the 2008 general election, breaking a 90-year hold by left-wing parties over the seat; Kaye became the first ever National MP for the electorate.

First term
As an MP, Kaye has, amongst other things, supported applications for the New Zealand Cycle Trail fund for routes in urban Auckland, on Waiheke Island and Great Barrier Island (the latter two islands being in her electorate as well). In early 2010, she broke with the National Party's policy of encouraging mining in conservation land, including on Great Barrier – claiming long connections to the island, and fitting in with her known support for environmental causes. She had noted during her maiden speech in parliament that "Our environment is the greatest gift we have been given as a nation", and that economical considerations, especially of the short term, should not trump this. Kaye is a supporter of reinstating trams for Auckland, and has called for a feasibility study into extending the new Wynyard Loop.

She holds up former National MP Katherine Rich as one of her role models. Kaye's own policies, placing her in the socially liberal wing of the National Party, have been criticised by some people in her own party, where some have called her a "high maintenance backbencher". Others have called her "obsessive", or, in a more positive vein, "driven". However, commentators have argued that her stance is unlikely to hurt her in her marginal electorate, which has traditionally voted Labour.

Kaye was elected the deputy chair of the Government Administration Select Committee in February 2011. In her first parliamentary term, she also sat on the Local Government and Environment Select Committee and the Auckland Governance Legislation Select Committee. Through her time in Parliament on these committees she has been heavily involved in the review of the Resource Management (Simplifying and Streamlining) Amendment Bill and legislation creating the Auckland Council.

In May 2011, Kaye appeared in an episode of the TVNZ series Make the Politician Work. The episode featured Kaye working a shift on a rubbish collection route and highlighted her campaign for waste minimisation in Auckland.

She was challenged for the seat by Labour list MP Jacinda Ardern and Green candidate Denise Roche, and was placed at position 33 on the National Party list. She defeated Ardern, although her majority was halved to 717, her share of the vote increased to 45.39%, due to significant strategic voting by Green Party voters supporting Ardern for the electorate vote.

Second term
Following the 2011 election, Kaye was elected Chair of Parliament's Education and Science Select Committee. During this time, despite a minority of Government members on the Committee, she managed to progress a significant number of inquiries and pieces of legislation through the House process. At the end of 2012 the Education and Science Select Committee completed an inquiry into 21st Century Learning Environments and Digital Literacy, which Kaye championed.

Kaye was instrumental in bringing a gay pride event back to Auckland, where there is a significant LGBT community in her electorate. In 2012 she worked with Green MP Kevin Hague on a private member's bill to reform adoption and surrogacy laws, which was introduced to Parliament that year. In August 2012, Kaye successfully led the campaign within the National Party to retain the alcohol purchase age at 18, despite significant support from parliamentary colleagues to raise the purchase age.

On 29 August 2012 Kaye delivered a speech at Parliament in favour of Louisa Wall's Marriage (Definition of Marriage) Amendment Act 2013, which she voted for through all stages. This was met with positive reception from members of the LGBT community.

Third term and promotion to Cabinet Minister 

On 22 January 2013 Kaye was appointed by Prime Minister John Key to the Cabinet of New Zealand and was appointed as Minister for Food Safety, Minister of Civil Defence and Minister of Youth Affairs, along with being made the Associate Minister of Education and Associate Minister of Immigration.

After the 2014 general election, Kaye was appointed Minister for ACC, while retaining her other portfolios, except Food Safety and Associate Immigration. In 2016 she took leave from Parliament and her ministerial duties while being treated for breast cancer. She returned to Parliament in early 2017 to resume full duties.

In the 2017 election Kaye retained the Auckland Central electorate in the 2017 election, but National became an opposition party.

National Party deputy leader 

In May 2020, there was a challenge to the National Party leadership, where Todd Muller sought to replace Simon Bridges as leader of the National Party. The media reported days ahead of the vote that Kaye was understood to be Muller's running mate and was seeking to become the party's deputy leader, but she refused to confirm if she would stand, with news articles referring to her as the "presumed" candidate even hours before the vote. On 22 May 2020 the party parliamentary caucus elected both Muller as leader and Kaye as deputy leader.

On 25 May 2020, she incorrectly described Paul Goldsmith as Māori when defending the diversity of Muller's Shadow Cabinet.

On 2 July 2020, Kaye assumed the Women's portfolio within Todd Muller's shadow cabinet after former Deputy Leader Paula Bennett announced that she would not be contesting the 2020 New Zealand general election.

Following Todd Muller's resignation as National Party leader, Kaye became acting (interim) leader for several hours. Later that day, Judith Collins was elected to succeed Muller, and Gerry Brownlee replaced Kaye.

Kaye announced that she was leaving politics two days later. Her resignation took effect at the October 2020 general election.

References

External links

Official website
New MP outlines priorities for Auckland Central, NZ Herald
Auckland Central MP's heartfelt belief, NZ Herald
Parliament TV – Nikki Kaye

|-

|-

|-

|-

|-

|-

1980 births
Living people
New Zealand National Party MPs
University of Otago alumni
Women government ministers of New Zealand
People from Auckland
New Zealand MPs for Auckland electorates
Members of the New Zealand House of Representatives
Government ministers of New Zealand
Members of the Cabinet of New Zealand
21st-century New Zealand politicians
21st-century New Zealand women politicians
Women members of the New Zealand House of Representatives
Candidates in the 2017 New Zealand general election
New Zealand education ministers
Women deputy opposition leaders
Deputy opposition leaders